Abingdon & Witney College is a further education provider established in April 2001 after the merger of Abingdon College and West Oxfordshire College. It has four campuses: Abingdon, Witney, Common Leys Farm and a new Construction Skills Centre in Bicester.

Introduction
Abingdon & Witney College provides vocational courses for post-16 students, as well as Higher Education, part-time and Professional programmes.

As well as vocational qualifications, Abingdon & Witney College is an apprenticeship provider and in 2015 was the No.1 Further Education College in England for 16-18 year old success rates.

The College was graded "good" with "outstanding" leadership and management by Ofsted in January 2014.

In June 2015 the Oxfordshire Skills and Learning Service (OSLS) transferred from Oxfordshire County Council to Abingdon & Witney College.

Abingdon Campus
The Abingdon Campus has undergone major refurbishment over the last few years, with the building work being completed in late 2015.
 
Part of the refurbishment was the Advanced Technology Centre, which is being funded by the Local Enterprise Partnership.

Witney Campus
The recent redevelopment of the college also encompassed the Witney campus, with building work being completed in early 2016.

Among the new facilities is a television studio.

A new Construction Skills Centre has also been built on-site.

Common Leys Campus
The Common Leys campus is a 60-acre plot in Hailey, Oxfordshire designed to deliver land-based courses.

The facility is home to animals such as a family of meerkats, horses, sheep, pigs, goats and cattle.

The Common Leys Campus was graded "outstanding" by Ofsted in January 2014.

Witney Stud Farm is based at the Common Leys campus and is home to a thoroughbred stud and equestrian centre which was recently awarded a Queen's Anniversary Prize.

Avenue One Skills Centre (Witney)
Avenue One is a construction skills centre in Witney.
 
The Centre was established as a collaborative project by The West Oxfordshire Learning Partnership – a partnership between the college and local Secondary Schools.

Prime Minister David Cameron officially opened the facility in 2013.

Higher education
Abingdon & Witney College has developed working links with Oxford Brookes University and The University of Gloucestershire in the deliverance of Higher Education courses.

References

External links
Official website

Abingdon-on-Thames
Education in Oxfordshire
Further education colleges in Oxfordshire
Educational institutions established in 2001
The Abingdon Consortium
2001 establishments in England